The 1892 United States presidential election in Mississippi took place on November 8, 1892. All contemporary 44 states were part of the 1892 United States presidential election. Mississippi voters chose nine electors to the Electoral College, which selected the president and vice president.

Mississippi was won by the Democratic nominees, former President Grover Cleveland of New York and his running mate Adlai Stevenson I of Illinois. However, Weaver performed well in the South as he won counties in Alabama, Georgia, Mississippi, North Carolina, and Texas. Weaver's win in Chickasaw County was the last time a Democrat lost any county in Mississippi in a statewide election until Herbert Hoover won the Pine Belt counties of Pearl River, Stone and George in 1928.

Results

Results by county

Notes

References

Mississippi
1892
1892 Mississippi elections